Horrorhammer is the fifth album by Abscess. It was released on April 24, 2007 on Tyrant Syndicate Productions.

Track listing
All Songs Written By Chris Reifert, except where noted.

  "Drink the Filth" – 2:40 (Bower)
  "New Diseases" – 1:58
  "Poison Messiah" – 4:12
  "Another Private Hell" – 1:13
  "Exterminate" – 2:56
  "When Witches Burn" – 3:20 (Allen, Coralles)
  "Four Grey Walls" – 2:15
  "Beneath a Blood Red Sun" – 3:46
  "Horrorhammer" – 2:44
  "Hellhole" – 2:38 (Coralles)
  "March of the Plague" – 4:46 (Bower)
  "The Eternal Pyre" – 2:27

Personnel
Clint Bower: Lead & Rhythm Guitars, Vocals, Bass
Danny Corrales: Lead & Rhythm Guitars, Bass
Joe Allen: Bass
Chris Reifert: Drums, Vocals, Bass

Production
Recorded, Produced, Engineered & Mixed By Adam Munoz

References

2007 albums
Abscess (band) albums